Thomas Townley Macan (born 14 November 1946) was Governor and Commander-in-Chief  of the British Virgin Islands, an overseas territory of the United Kingdom in the Caribbean Sea, from 14 October 2004 to 10 April 2006. He was educated at Shrewsbury School and the University of Sussex. 

On the advice of the British government, he was appointed by Queen Elizabeth II to represent the Queen in the territory and to act as the de facto head of state.

References 

1946 births
Living people
Governors of the British Virgin Islands
People educated at Shrewsbury School
Alumni of the University of Sussex